Katiola is a town in central Ivory Coast. It is a sub-prefecture of and the seat of Katiola Department. It is also a commune and the seat of Hambol Region in Vallée du Bandama District.

Transport 
Katiola is served by a station on the national railway system and by Katiola Airport.

In 2014, the population of the sub-prefecture of Katiola was 56,681.

Villages
The 11 villages of the sub-prefecture of Katiola and their population in 2014 are:
 Foro-Foro (1 091)
 Katiola (40 319)
 Kationon 1 (1 135)
 Kationon 2 (1 124)
 Kowara (512)
 Kpéfélé (1 041)
 Logbonou (7 545)
 N'dana (489)
 Nikolo (1 394)
 Tiédiarikaha (688)
 Touro Gare (1 343)

References 

Sub-prefectures of Hambol
Communes of Hambol
Regional capitals of Ivory Coast